Enantiosis, synoeciosis or discordia concors is a rhetorical device in which opposites are juxtaposed so that the contrast between them is striking.  Examples include the famous maxim of Augustus, festina lente (hasten slowly), and the following passage from Paul's second letter to the Corinthians:

Dr. Johnson in his Lives of the Poets (1779) defined discordia concors as "a combination of dissimilar images, or discovery of occult resemblances in things apparently unlike. (...) The most heterogeneous ideas are yoked by violence together."

See also
 antithesis
 irony
 oxymoron
 paradox

References

Rhetoric